Oļegs is a given name. Notable people with the name include:
Oļegs Aleksejenko (born 1961), former Latvian international football midfielder
Oļegs Antropovs (born 1947), Latvian former volleyball player
Oļegs Blagonadeždins (born 1973), retired football defender from Latvia
Oļegs Deņisovs (born 1966), Latvian politician
Oļegs Karavajevs (born 1961), former Latvian football goalkeeper
Oļegs Laizāns (born 1987), football midfielder from Latvia
Oļegs Maļuhins (born 1969), Latvian biathlete who retired after the 2006 Turin Olympics
Oļegs Malašenoks (born 1986), Latvian professional footballer
Oļegs Sorokins (born 1974), Latvian professional ice hockey defender
Oļegs Znaroks (born 1963), Latvian former ice hockey player

Latvian masculine given names